Schiedam is a city and municipality in the west of the Netherlands. It is located in the Rotterdam–The Hague metropolitan area, west of Rotterdam, east of Vlaardingen, and south of Delft. In the south the city is connected with the village of Pernis by the Beneluxtunnel.

The city is known for its historical center with canals, and for having the tallest windmills in the world. Schiedam is also well known for the distilleries and malthouses and production of jenever (gin) − such as the internationally renowned Ketel One − so much so that in French and English the word schiedam (usually without a capital s-) refers to the town's Holland gin. This was the town's main industry during the early Industrial Revolution in the 18th and 19th century, a period to which it owed its former nickname "Zwart Nazareth" or "Black Nazareth". Furthermore, the city is known for Saint Lidwina, one of the most famous Dutch saints (her relics are located in the Liduina Basilica in Schiedam).

History 
Schiedam was founded around the year 1230. The river Schie was dammed by the Lord of Wassenaer and the Amtlord Dirk Bokel of the Amt Mathenesse, this to protect the existing polderland against the seawater from the North Sea. In 1247, Lady Adelaide (Aleida) of Holland married John I, Count of Hainaut.  As dowry she received from him the eastern part of the dam together with the adjacent polder. The dam attracted many trade activities because goods for and from the hinterland (Delft, and further away Leiden and Haarlem) had to be transhipped. A small town developed swiftly around the dam and its activities. In the year 1275 Schiedam received city rights from Lady Adelaide, this in her capacity as sister of William II, the reigning Count of Holland and becoming King of the Romans. She ordered the building of Te Riviere Castle near the Schie, which is known today as "Castle Mathenesse" (Dutch: "Huis te Riviere" or "Slot Mathenesse"). Remnants of a donjon, which were once part of the castle, are still visible today in the centre of Schiedam and near the city office.

As a young settlement Schiedam soon got competition from surrounding towns and cities: in 1340, Rotterdam and Delft also were allowed to establish a connection between the Schie and the Meuse. From the 15th century on the city flourished as a place of pilgrimage on the devotion around Saint Lidwina, one of the most famous Dutch saints who lived her life in Schiedam. The city gained subsequently significance by fishing for herring. In 1428 a great city fire swept through Schiedam, thereby destroying large parts of the then wooden city.

The 18th century was Schiedam's Golden Age, when the gin industry flourished. The standstill drink imports from France made the emergence of the Schiedamse distillery possible. From dozens of distilleries Schiedam jenever was exported throughout the world. The gin industry gave the city its nickname 'Black Nazareth'. This industry is now largely gone. Five windmills in the town, called De Noord, Walvisch, Drie Koornbloemen, Nieuwe Palmboom and Vrijheid − are the highest traditional style windmills in the world because they had to stick out above the high warehouses, and many storehouses are relics of this past. In one of the former factories at the Lange Haven the National Jenever Museum is established.

On 10 August 1856, the first major train accident in the Netherlands happened near the Schiedam railway station, causing 3 deaths. On 4 May 1976 the Schiedam train disaster also took place near the station which caused 24 deaths.

At the end of the 19th and throughout the 20th century, the shipbuilding industry was booming in Schiedam, with large companies like Wilton-Fijenoord and others. In 1941, the ancient municipalities Kethel en Spaland were merged with Schiedam, which made large expansions of the city possible with residential areas in the north.  At the end of the 20th century, the shipbuilding industry largely disappeared and today, Schiedam is mainly a commuter area in the Rotterdam metropolitan area.

Geography 
The city of Schiedam is located in the Dutch province of South Holland. It is enclosed between Rotterdam (east), Midden-Delfland (north), Vlaardingen (west) and the river Nieuwe Maas (south).

Demographics
55,44% Dutch background,
14,42% Western migration background,
30,15% Non western migration background

Composition
Schiedam exists of nine districts: Centrum ('Center'), Oost ('East'), Gorzen ('South'), West ('West'), Nieuwland, Groenoord, Kethel, Woudhoek and Spaland/Sveaparken.

Attractions

Museums 
 
 
 Het Borrelmuseum (in 't Spul on Hoogstraat)
 
 Nationaal Coöperatie Museum Schiedam / 't Winkeltje
 Artgallery 't Walvisch

Monuments 
 The old city hall
 The canals of Schiedam
 The Wheat Exchange (De Korenbeurs)
 Church of Saint John (Grote of Sint-Janskerk)
 The ruins of Te Riviere Castle
 
 De Plantage (a park)
 The Porters' Guild House
 Het Proveniershuis (housing elderly people)
 The historical windmills of Schiedam. This includes the tallest windmill in the world which is used as a restaurant.

Events 

The National Windmill Days (Nationale Molen- & Gemalen dag)
Lip dub
Monthly art exhibition at Artipico Art Gallery (maandelijkse Kunstborrel)

Sport 
The most popular sports in Schiedam are soccer and field hockey. The town used to have two professional soccer teams, one named SVV (Schiedamse voetbal vereniging), whereas the other one was named Hermes along the Damlaan where also cricket was played. Both disappeared after financial problems. Cricket is most popular in Schiedam --due to Hermes-- than in most other Dutch cities.

Education 
High schools in Schiedam:
 Schravenlant

Notable residents

Public Thinking & Public Service 

 Saint Lidwina (1380–1433) a Dutch mystic, honored as a saint by the Catholic Church 
 Jacobus Taurinus (1576–1618) a preacher and theologian, supporter of the Remonstrants
 Cornelius Haga (1578–1654) ambassador of the Dutch Republic to the Ottoman Empire
 Willem Nieupoort (1607–1678) a politician and ambassador, negotiated the Treaty of Westminster (1654)
 Jan van Riebeeck (1619–1677) colonial administrator, founded Cape Town, South Africa
 James Scott, 1st Duke of Monmouth (1649–1685) illegitimate son of Charles II of England
 Harmen van Bol'es (1689-1764) a Royal master builder in Russia, Town Carpenter in Schiedam
 Engelbertus Lucas Sr. (1747–1797) a Dutch rear-admiral, commanding a squadron of the Batavian Navy
 Engelbertus Lucas Jr. (1785–1870) a Dutch senior naval officer
 Piet Paaltjens (1835–1894) a Protestant clergyman and romantic author
 Christian Osepins (1858–1887) a US Navy sailor, recipient of the Medal of Honor
 Dirk Jan de Geer (1870–1960) a politician, Dutch Prime Minister 1926/1929 and 1939/1940  
 Philips Christiaan Visser (1882–1955) a diplomat, geographer, mountaineer and glaciologist 
 Jeanne Lampl-de Groot (1895–1987) a Dutch psychiatrist, worked with Sigmund Freud
 Thomas van der Hammen (1924-2010) a Dutch palaeontologist, botanist and geologist
 Wil Velders-Vlasblom (1930-2019) a Dutch politician and woman's rights activist
 Pieter van Vollenhoven (born 1939) husband of Princess Margriet of the Netherlands
 Johannes Bronkhorst (born 1946) an academic and Indologist specialising in early Buddhism 
 Elizabeth Witmer (born 1946) member of the Legislative Assembly of Ontario, Canada
 Herman Heinsbroek (born 1951) entrepreneur and former Minister of Economic Affairs
 Pieter Elbers (born 1970) a Dutch airline executive, President and CEO of KLM

The Arts 

 Adam Pynacker (1622–1673) Dutch Golden Age painter, mostly of landscapes
 Piet van Stuivenberg (1901–1988) sculptor, painter, lithographer and graphic artist
 Arnold van Mill (1921–1996) a Dutch opera singer who sang bass
 Wim Meuldijk (1922–2007) writer, illustrator and screenwriter; created Pipo de Clown
 Theresia van der Pant (1924–2013) a Dutch sculptor
 Gé Korsten (1927-1999) a South African singer of Dutch descent
 Rien Poortvliet (1932–1995) Dutch painter of the Gnomes book series
 Henk de Vlieger (born 1953) a Dutch percussionist, composer and arranger
 Mike Redman (born 1978) a musician, record producer and film maker 
 Joey Roukens (born 1982) a Dutch composer of contemporary classical music

Sport 

 Rinus Gosens (1920–2008) a football player and manager
 Hans Eijkenbroek (born 1940) a retired footballer with 339 club caps and manager
 Pauline van der Wildt (born 1944) a retired Dutch swimmer, team bronze medallist at the 1964 Summer Olympics
 Yvonne Buter (born 1959) a former Dutch field hockey goalkeeper, team bronze medallist at the 1988 Summer Olympics
 John de Wolf (born 1962) a Dutch former professional footballer with over 350 club caps
 Angela Venturini (born 1964) a Dutch former cricketer
 Willem Noorduin (born 1967) a Paralympian athlete and Olympic medallist 
 Robin van der Laan (born 1968) a former footballer with 401 club caps and manager
 Robert Maaskant (born 1969) a Dutch former professional footballer and current manager
 Luuk van Troost (born 1969) cricketer, captained the Netherlands national cricket team
 Erik Jazet (born 1971) a former field hockey player, team medallist in three Olympic Games
 Andre van Troost (born 1972) a Dutch former cricketer, a right-arm fast bowler
 Rob Cordemans (born 1974) a Dutch baseball player
 Ali Elkhattabi (born 1977) a retired Dutch-Moroccan footballer with 238 club caps
 Danny Koevermans (born 1978) a Dutch former footballer with 296 club caps, currently a coach
 Gökhan Saki (born 1983) a Dutch-Turkish kickboxer and mixed martial artist
 Jos van Emden (born 1985) a Dutch road bicycle racer and time-trial specialist
 Kelly Dulfer (born 1994) a Dutch handball player with the Dutch national team
Joshua Zirkzee (born 2001) a Dutch football player

International relations

Twin towns – Sister cities
Schiedam is twinned with:

All these contacts were under review after a decision of the municipal council on 4 February 2010 
 Schiedam is a member city of Eurotowns network

Gallery

See also 
 HMS Schiedam
 Nieuwland, Kortland, en 's-Graveland

References

External links 

 
Historical Society Schiedam
Windmills of Schiedam
Touristic Information Schiedam

 
Populated places established in the 13th century
Municipalities of South Holland
Populated places in South Holland